Roelofs is a Dutch language patronymic surname. The common Dutch given name Roelof is equivalent to Rudolph. People with this surname include:

Al Roelofs (1906–1990), Dutch-born American art director
 (1877–1920), Dutch painter, son of Willem
Annemarie Roelofs (born 1955), Dutch trombone player and violinist
Arjen Roelofs (1754–1828), Dutch astronomer
Ingeborg Roelofs (born 1983), Dutch handball player
Jan Roelofs (born 1985), Dutch motorcycle racer
 (born 1984), Dutch jazz saxophonist, clarinetist, and flutist
Justin Roelofs, American musician
Karl Roelofs (born 1964), American video game developer
 (born 1968), Dutch DJ
Sandra Roelofs (born 1968), Dutch linguist and the First Lady of Georgia from 2004 to 2013
Wendell L. Roelofs (born 1938), American organic chemist
Willem Roelofs (1822–1897), Dutch painter

A less common spelling is Roeloffs:
Eleanor Roeloffs (born 1940), American political reporter
Hugo Roeloffs (1844-1928), Syndicus of Hamburg

See also
Roelof
Roelofsen, Dutch surname of the same origin

Dutch-language surnames
Patronymic surnames